Annabella is a townland near Mallow, County Cork in Ireland. Some sources give the townland's Irish name as Eanach-bile, and translate it as "marsh of the sacred tree [bile]". Other sources dispute this derivation as a back-formed neologism. Mallow railway station (built c.1845) lies within Annabella townland.

References

Notes

Mallow, County Cork